Morals and Dogma of the Ancient and Accepted Scottish Rite of Freemasonry, or simply Morals and Dogma, is a book of esoteric philosophy published by the Supreme Council, Thirty Third Degree, of the Scottish Rite, Southern Jurisdiction of the United States. It was compiled by Albert Pike, was first published in 1871 and was regularly reprinted thereafter until 1969. An upgraded official reprint was released in 2011, with the benefit of annotations by Arturo de Hoyos, the Scottish Rite's Grand Archivist and Grand Historian.

Contents

Morals and Dogma has been described as "a collection of thirty-two essays which provide a philosophical rationale for the degrees of the Ancient and Accepted Scottish Rite. The lectures provided a backdrop for the degrees by giving lessons in comparative religion, history and philosophy".

The original printing had 861 pages of text, while a 218-page Digest-Index was added by Trevanion W. Hugo, 33°, G∴C∴, in 1909. Its thirty-two chapters discuss the philosophical symbolism of a degree of Scottish Rite Freemasonry in extensive detail. In Pike's original Preface, he noted:

He continued:

Though it discusses the minutiae of Masonic ritual at length, it is written so as not to unveil the Masonic secrets.  Ritual motions and objects are named and elaborated upon, but not described. In his allocution of 1947, Pike's successor, Grand Commander John Henry Cowles, noted that some Masonic publications had used large extracts from the text, which practice he sought to curtail by adding the following words to the title page: 'Esoteric Book, for Scottish Rite use only; to be Returned upon Withdrawal or Death of Recipient' (Transactions of the Supreme Council, 33°, S.J. (1947), p. 38).  Although Morals and Dogma is an esoteric book, it was not a secret one; Pike's original preface was clear that any Mason could own the book, but only Scottish Rite Masons would be encouraged to own one.

There are 32 chapters (1 per degree in the masonic ranks of the southern jurisdiction, the 33° being the only exception), These chapters generally consist of comparative religion, philosophy, comparative etymologies, symbolism, and numerology.  The primary themes are the "Secrets" or the "Great Mysteries" and their symbolism and rituals. It is stated that nothing in the book is meant to unveil any of the secrets of Freemasonry but to simply hint or shed light.  An emphasis on religious and cultural tolerance is shown throughout the work, emphasizing that the root of all religions is the same (according with the Prisca Theologia doctrine). These common traits and symbols in all religions are explained in detail, beginning with the Orphic Egg or Cosmic Egg, and then moving towards ancient Egyptian, Phoenician, Buddhist, and Hindu texts, and the Abrahamic religions.

A copy of Morals and Dogma was given to every new member of the Southern Jurisdiction from the early 1900s until 1969 (although some local Scottish Rite bodies offered copies through the mid-1970s), when it was deemed "too advanced to be helpful to the new Scottish Rite member."  In 1974 it was initially replaced by Clausen's Commentaries on Morals and Dogma, written by Henry Clausen, 33°, Sovereign Grand Commander, which in 1988 was itself replaced by A Bridge To Light, by Rex Hutchens, 33°, G∴C∴, which book continues to be given to initiates into the Scottish Rite in the Southern Jurisdiction.  With the release of the authorized edition of 2011, Morals and Dogma is once more being given to new Scottish Rite Masons in the Southern Jurisdiction, and all restrictions on sales to the general public have been removed.

During Pike's lifetime the Northern Jurisdiction based many of their degrees upon Pike's rituals, although they subsequently revised them many times, and never presented initiates with Morals and Dogma, nor any of the subsequent commentaries.

Influences and plagiarism allegations
One of Pike's influences was the French author Éliphas Lévi. Lévi was a prolific writer on occult topics who, in Pike's day, was considered an expert on pagan mysteries and Gnosticism. Some authors have, since his death, considered Levi's writings, and adeptship, to be spurious. For instance, occult scholar, A. E. Waite, after researching Levi's texts relating to the Kabalah, wrote: "I  do  not  think  that  he  [Lévi]  ever  made  an  independent statement upon any historical fact to which the least confidence could be given with prudence.". Eliphas Levi (whose real name was Alphonse Louis Constant) was of Jewish genetic ancestry. He claimed to have gnosis of ancient, and medieval Judaic esoterica, when in reality, having been raised a Roman Catholic (who went on to a seminary), he was not even formally schooled in the Jewish exoteric tradition of his own time (the 19th century).  Levi never officially converted to Judaism.

In his book Dogme et Rituel de la Haute Magie (1855), Lévi claimed that Freemasonry had its roots in ancient pagan rituals, and Pike accepted many of these claims.  According to Chris Hodapp, "whole passages of Levi's book [were] made into Pike's".

French philosopher René Guénon noticed that "a considerable part of ... Morals and Dogma of Freemasonry is clearly plagiarized from Dogme et Rituel de la Haute Magie by the French occultist Éliphas Lévi". Craig Heimbichner and Adam Parfrey write that Pike "seemed untroubled by the need to properly attribute text that he borrowed or lifted" and that in Morals and Dogma "Pike plagiarized from the French occultist Eliphas Lévi."

Although Pike borrowed extensively from Lévi, he extracted even more from the works of the Rev. Orville Dewey, Rev. Theodore Parker, George Oliver, Charles Francois Dupuis, and Jacques Matter. The Annotated Edition by Arturo de Hoyos (see below) cites paragraph-by-paragraph virtually all the sources which amount to over a hundred other authors.

Authorized republication history

After 1969 the copyright of Morals and Dogma was not renewed; and, like many out-of-copyright works, it was reprinted many times by various publishers. However, in August 2011 the Supreme Council, 33°, S.J., announced that a new, authorized edition had been published. Titled Albert Pike’s Morals and Dogma: Annotated Edition, the work was prepared by Arturo de Hoyos, 33°, G∴C∴, K.Y.C.H., the Scottish Rite's Grand Archivist and Grand Historian. The text is reprinted in full, with about 4000 scholarly notes on difficult passages, touching on historical, religious, and philosophical issues. The new edition is augmented by subject headings, and illustrations from the original books Pike used, new paragraph numbers, and corrections based upon original texts.

References

External links

Masonic books
1872 books